The 2021–22 California Golden Bears men's basketball team represented the University of California, Berkeley, in the 2021–22 NCAA Division I men's basketball season. This was Mark Fox's third year as head coach at California. The Golden Bears played their home games at Haas Pavilion as members of the Pac-12 Conference.

Previous season
The Golden Bears finished the 2020–21 season with a record of 9–20, 3–17 in Pac-12 play to finish in last place. They defeated Stanford in the first round of the Pac-12 tournament before losing to Colorado in the quarterfinals.

Off-season

Departures

Incoming transfers

2021 recruiting class

Roster

Schedule and results
Source:

|-
!colspan=12 style=| Exhibition
 
|-
!colspan=12 style=| Regular season

{{CBB Schedule Entry
| date          = February 3, 2022
| time          = 8:00pm
| opponent      = Washington
| site_stadium  = Haas Pavilion
| site_cityst   = Berkeley, CA
| tv            = P12N
| highscorer    = Anyanwu
| points        = 10
| highrebounder = 
| rebounds      = 6
| highassister  = | assists       = 3
| score         = 63–84
| attend        = 4,038
| record        = 9–14
| conference    = 2–10
}}

|-
!colspan=12 style=| Pac-12 tournament

Rankings*The preseason and week 1 polls were the same.^Coaches poll was not released for Week 2.''

Notes

References

California Golden Bears men's basketball seasons
California
California Golden
California Golden